Nattawut Madyalan, is a Thai futsal Winger, and currently a member of  Thailand national futsal team.

References
 

Nattawut Madyalan
1990 births
Living people
Nattawut Madyalan
Nattawut Madyalan
Southeast Asian Games medalists in futsal
Nattawut Madyalan
Competitors at the 2011 Southeast Asian Games